Bare as Bone, Bright as Blood is the thirteenth and final studio album by the English rock band Pretty Things. It was released in September 2020, a few months after the death of lead singer Phil May.

Track listing

Personnel
The Pretty Things
Phil May – lead vocals
Dick Taylor – lead guitar, acoustic guitar, slide guitar, extra guitars
with:
George Woosey – acoustic guitar
Henry Padovani – acoustic guitar, lead guitar
Sam Brothers – acoustic guitar, lead guitar, banjo, harmonica, sundry guitar
Jon Wigg – violin
Mark St. John – percussion
Technical
Mark St. John – producer, engineer, mixing, cover design, cover concept, band photographs
Frederick Jude - executive producer
Gwyn Mathias - mastering
Beech - artwork, layout, cover design, cover concept
Judy Totton - band photographs

References

2020 albums
Pretty Things albums